Matthew Simson (born 28 May 1970) is a male British former shot putter.

Simson was a bronze medallist at the European Athletics Junior Championships in 1989 and won the silver at the 1991 Summer Universiade. At senior level he represented Great Britain at the 1997 IAAF World Indoor Championships and the 1989 European Athletics Indoor Championships. He studied at the University of Florida and competed for the Florida Gators while there.

Career
Simson began to compete in shot put as a teenager at Thurrock Harriers in Grays, Essex. He won the junior (under-15s) category at the 1984 English Schools Championships, was the intermediate (under-17s) champion in 1986, then succeeded Simon Williams to the under-19s English Schools' title in 1987. He established himself as the top young shot putter of his generation, winning four straight titles at the AAA Junior Championships and three straight AAA Junior Indoor titles. He set national indoor age bests for 16-year-olds in 1987 and 17-year-olds in 1988. In international competition he placed seventh at the 1987 European Athletics Junior Championships before improving to take the bronze medal at the 1989 edition. He was fifth in the shot put at the 1988 World Junior Championships in Athletics.

He was also runner-up to Paul Edwards at the UK Athletics Championships and second to Simon Williams at the AAA Championships. He also made his senior international debut, competing at the 1989 European Athletics Indoor Championships where he came in eleventh place.

He began studying in the United States at the University of Florida and competed athletically for their Florida Gators team. He was over nineteen metres again at the 1991 Summer Universiade held in Sheffield and was the silver medallist behind Soviet Union's Aleksandr Klimenko. He was second to Paul Edwards at both the AAA and UK Championships that year.

He missed most of the 1992 season, bar a pair of third-place finishes at the AAA Championships and the 1992 European Athletics U23 Cup. He returned in 1993, starting with a fifth-place finish at the NCAA Indoor meet. He resumed his position as runner-up behind Edwards at the UK Championships but managed to defeat his national rival at the AAA Championships, taking his first senior title at the event.

The 1994 season marked the peak of Simson's career. He won the Southeastern Conference Championship title for the Florida Gators before being selected to represent England at the 1994 Commonwealth Games. This meant he edged Courtney Ireland into second to win the gold medal. He completed his final year of college in Florida in 1995, with a highlight including a win at the Florida Relays.

He claimed the second AAA title of his career by beating Shaun Pickering by a margin of 19 cm. He also placed fourth at the London Grand Prix that year. In 1997 his best efforts came indoors. He failed to follow up on his Commonwealth success, however, and was eliminated in the qualifying rounds of the global tournament. Outdoors he was runner-up at the UK Championships to Shaun Pickering – the contest marked the first time two athletes had thrown over nineteen metres at the competition. This proved to be his last major outing at national level and he retired from professional athletics in 1998.

Personal bests
Shot put outdoor –  (1994)
Shot put indoor –  (1997)

National titles
Shot put
AAA Indoor Championships: 1989
AAA Championships: 1993, 1996

International competitions

References

External links

Living people
1970 births
British male shot putters
English male shot putters
People from Essex
Sportspeople from Essex
Commonwealth Games medallists in athletics
Commonwealth Games gold medallists for England
Athletes (track and field) at the 1990 Commonwealth Games
Athletes (track and field) at the 1994 Commonwealth Games
Florida Gators men's track and field athletes
Universiade medalists in athletics (track and field)
Universiade silver medalists for Great Britain
Medalists at the 1991 Summer Universiade
Medallists at the 1994 Commonwealth Games